Mathew Boniface (born 5 October 1994 in Kaduna) is a Nigerian footballer who plays as a striker for S.U. Sintrense.

Career 
Boniface began his career with Supreme court F.C. of Abuja Nigeria. In 2015, he signed with Aris Limassol FC in Cyprus First Division and in summer 2016 he joined the Kosovo club KF Trepça'89 in winter 2017 he signed with Albanian Superliga club Partizani Tirana.

On 27 July 2017, Boniface signed with Bulgarian club Beroe Stara Zagora<ref>

References

External links 
 
 
 Mathew Boniface at Eurosport.com

Living people
1994 births
Sportspeople from Kaduna
Nigerian footballers
Nigerian expatriate footballers
Nigerian expatriate sportspeople in Cyprus
Nigerian expatriate sportspeople in Albania
Expatriate footballers in Cyprus
Expatriate footballers in Kosovo
Expatriate footballers in Albania
Cypriot First Division players
Kategoria Superiore players
Aris Limassol FC players
KF Trepça players
FK Partizani Tirana players
Association football forwards